Gmina Moryń is an urban-rural gmina (administrative district) in Gryfino County, West Pomeranian Voivodeship, in north-western Poland.

The gmina contains part of the protected area called Cedynia Landscape Park.

Villages
Apart from the town of Moryń, Gmina Moryń contains the villages and settlements of Bielin, Dolsko, Gądno, Klępicz, Macierz, Mierno, Mirowo, Młynary, Moryń-Dwór, Niwka, Nowe Objezierze, Przyjezierze, Skotnica, Stare Objezierze, Wisław, Witnica and Witniczka.

Neighbouring Gminas
Gmina Moryń is bordered by the gminas of Cedynia, Chojna and Mieszkowice.

References
Polish official population figures 2006

Moryn
Gryfino County